Marko Valok (born 5 March 1927) is a Serbian retired professional footballer who represented Yugoslavia internationally.

Playing career

Napredak Kruševac
He was part of the FK Napredak Kruševac team right at the foundation of the club in 1946, and made history for that club as the first ever goalscorer of the club, by scoring the only goal in Napredak's first ever official match against Makedonija, a 1–1 draw.

Partizan
In 1947 he moved to FK Partizan where he had a successful career until his retirement, twelve years later. His first Yugoslav First League game he played in season 1947–48 when he won third place with Partizan. For Partizan, which was also the only club he played for, he played in the period until 1959 and during that time he played 470 games (165 championships) and scored 411 goals (90 championships). On Partizan's all-time top goalscorer list He is second behind Stjepan Bobek who scored (425 goals).

Valok won one Yugoslav championship title with Partizan in 1948–49 and three times Yugoslav Cup 1952, 1954 and 1956–57. In all three final matches in the cup, Marko Valok scored goals. In the finals in 1952 and 1954, he scored two goals each, and in the finals in 1957, he scored one goal.

He holds the record for most goals in the Serbian "eternal derby", scoring thirteen times against rivals Red Star Belgrade.

Yugoslavia national team
Valok played two games for Yugoslavia B team and six games for the best selection. He scored a total of three goals against Israel (2:5) in Tel Aviv two goals in the qualifying match for 1950 FIFA World Cup and in a friendly match in Stockholm against Sweden (1:2) one goal.

He made his national team debut on June 19, 1949 against Norway (1:3) in Oslo. And he played the last game for the national team against Austria (2:7) in Vienna October 8, 1950. He usually played in the positions of center forward and right wing.

Coaching career
As a sports instructor in JNA, Marko Valok worked in Myanmar (1959-1963), where he was also a coach for a while in Myanmar. In the period from 1963 to 1967, he worked in Partizan.

He worked as the coach of the Yugoslav national team in the period from 1977 to 1979.

He coached Burma, FK Partizan, Budućnost Titograd, Philadelphia Fury, FK Vojvodina, Adana Demirspor, Borac Banja Luka, Teteks Tetovo, Galenika Zemun and FK Rad. He also coached FK IM Rakovica.

References

External links
 Profile at reprezentacija.rs 

1927 births
Footballers from Belgrade
Yugoslav footballers
Serbian footballers
Yugoslavia international footballers
FK Napredak Kruševac players
FK Partizan players
Yugoslav First League players
Yugoslav Partisans members
Yugoslav football managers
Serbian football managers
FK Partizan managers
FK Vojvodina managers
FK Rad managers
North American Soccer League (1968–1984) coaches
FK Budućnost Podgorica managers
Adana Demirspor managers
Association football forwards
Serbian expatriate football managers